The 2012 Kyoto Sanga FC season sees Kyoto Sanga compete in J.League Division 2 for the second year in a row. This is their 19th nonconsecutive season in the second tier. Kyoto Sanga are also competing in the 2012 Emperor's Cup.

Players

Competitions

J. League

League table

Matches

Emperor's Cup

References

Kyoto Sanga FC
Kyoto Sanga FC seasons